Noord-Sleen is a village in the Netherlands and is part of the Coevorden municipality in Drenthe.

Noord-Sleen started as an esdorp which split from Sleen in the 9th century. It contains two village greens. It was first mentioned in 1365 as van Nortslene. In 1840, it was home to 350 people. The gristmill Albertdina was moved to Noord-Sleen in 1905.

There are two dolmen near Noord-Sleen.  is a large dolmen with a near complete ring of 24 stones. 7 of the 8 capstones are still present.  is not in a good condition, and it is clear that the capstones have been removed.

Gallery

References 

Coevorden
Populated places in Drenthe